Infinity Crush is an American bedroom pop band from Raleigh, North Carolina.

History
Infinity Crush started as the solo project of musician Caroline White in 2013. In that year, White released a number of extended plays, including Stumble Pretty and Sometimes Even In My Dreams I Am. White released her debut album as Infinity Crush in 2016 titled Warmth Equation. White released her second full-length album as Infinity Crush on August 9, 2019.

References

American pop music groups
Musical groups from North Carolina